John Dempsey (born 28 September 1965) is a New Zealand cricket umpire. He has stood in domestic matches in the 2017–18 Plunket Shield season and the 2017–18 Ford Trophy. He has also stood as an umpire in international matches featuring the New Zealand women's cricket team.

References

External links
 

1965 births
Living people
New Zealand cricket umpires
People from Papakura